is a Japanese manga series written and illustrated by Yu Muraoka. It has been serialized in Akita Shoten's shōnen manga magazine Weekly Shōnen Champion since October 2018. As of February 2023, the series has been collected in twenty-two tankōbon volumes. An anime television series adaptation by Bakken Record premiered in January 2023.

Plot
The story follows Michi Sonoda, a judoka who planned on quitting the sport after her final junior high judo tournament until her friend Sanae Takigawa invites her to continue together in high school.

Characters

Media

Manga
The series has been serialized in Akita Shoten's shōnen manga magazine Weekly Shōnen Champion since October 18, 2018. Akita Shoten has collected its chapters into individual tankōbon volumes. The first volume was released on February 8, 2019. As of February 8, 2023, twenty-two volumes have been released.

Volume list

Anime 
An anime adaptation was announced on the thirteenth volume of the manga on July 8, 2021. It was later revealed to be a television series produced by Bakken Record and directed by Ken Ogiwara, with Aya Satsuki handling the scripts, Airi Takekawa designing the characters and serving as chief animation director, and Shun Narita composing the music. The series premiered on January 9, 2023, on TV Tokyo and other networks. Sentai Filmworks licensed the series, and will be streaming it on Hidive. Muse Communication licensed the series in Asia-Pacific.

Episode list

Notes

References

External links 
Official manga website at Akita Shoten 
Official anime website 

2023 anime television series debuts
Akita Shoten manga
Anime series based on manga
Judo in anime and manga
Muse Communication
School life in anime and manga
Sentai Filmworks
Shōnen manga
Tatsunoko Production
TV Tokyo original programming